Asmara Brewery (formerly, Melotti Brewery) is a brewery in Eritrea, founded in 1938. The brewery was nationalized by the Derg during the Eritrean War of Independence. The brewery operates a football team, which plays in the Eritrean Premier League. The factory has over 600 employees.

History

The brewery was founded in 1938 (and started production in 1939) by Italian engineer Luigi Melotti. 

The brewery was nationalized by the Derg during the Eritrean War of Independence, and was then inherited by the Government of Eritrea. Ownership in the brewery is shared between investors and the Government of Eritrea. In 1998, its factory exported up to 40% of production, with the remainder being domestically consumed.
Production was affected during 2000 and production decreased for a period of time. However the production has since got back to normal levels, now even exporting products internationally to countries worldwide.
During WW2 and the present day it is one of the biggest companies in Eritrea. Melotti, the wealthy original owner, also built the famous "Villa Melotti" on the southern tip of Taulud Island in Massawa.

Overview

The Asmara Brewery plant covers an area of 100,000 square metres, 25,000 of which are covered by modern and functional buildings. The industrial activity includes the distillery, the liquor factory, the brewery, and the glass factory.

Distillery
The distillery consists of a modern installation for the production of alcohol from musts of dense wines, as this activity was installed for the industrial exploitation of the fruit of the doum palm. The distillery installation has a daily production capability of 24 hectolitres of denatured alcohol exceeding 96o.

Liquor factory
Liquor production has been mainly directed toward Ethiopian consumers, and the Melotti Liquor Factory markets several kinds of liquors particularly appreciated by the clientele. Production capability is about 50,000 bottles monthly. The most popular liquors are anise, cognac, fernet, gin, and zibib.

Brewery
Born during the war period in order to satisfy contingent necessities, initially under the direction of Luigi Melotti, and later his widow Emma Santini Melotti, the beer industry has constantly directed its efforts to satisfy market demands, both concerning the product's quality as well as the price. This requires the company to continuously update its facilities. Its beer is appreciated throughout the country, and even abroad where only currency difficulties limit its already flourishing exports. The annual production capability is about 500,000 hectolitres of beer.

Glass factory
The glass factory started its own production in January 1960 with new facilities built in 1959, allowing for production which extends from the 90 gr bottle to the 1000 gr bottle and to a vast range of glasses, which meet demand in all local markets.

Brewery products

The brewery produces a wide range of beverages. One of its best known is Ariki, an aniseed-flavored spirit. It also produces its famous Asmara beer (lager) and other beverages susch as gin, cognac and Fernet-Branca.

Football team

The brewery operates a football team, which plays in the Eritrean Premier League since the 1990s. The team was initially founded in 1944 with the name Asmara Birra by the engineer Melotti (he had already founded in 1938 the GS Melotti team. )

See also

Asmara Birra FC

References

Companies of Eritrea
Breweries in Eritrea
Organisations based in Asmara
1939 establishments in the Italian Empire